Events in the year 1875 in Belgium.

Incumbents
Monarch: Leopold II
Head of government: Jules Malou

Events
 Delhaize brothers go into retail business.
 4 February – Princess Louise of Belgium marries Prince Philipp of Saxe-Coburg and Gotha

Publications
Periodicals
Almanach royal officiel (Brussels, E. Guyot)
 Bulletins de l'Académie royale des sciences, des lettres et des beaux-arts de Belgique (Brussels, M. Hayez).
 Revue de l'horticulture belge et étrangère begins publication

Official publications
 Le Moniteur Belge.

Reference works
 Eugène Van Bemmel, Patria Belgica: Encyclopédie nationale, vol. 3 (Brussels, Bruylant-Christophe & Cie., 1875)

Books
 Hyacinthe De Bruyn, L'art belge au Salon de Bruxelles, 1875.

Art and architecture

Paintings
 Henri de Braekeleer, The Man in the Chair

Births
 12 January – Charles de Hemricourt de Grunne (died 1937)
 22 January – Blanche Rousseau, writer (died 1949)
 8 March – Maurice Hemelsoet, Olympic rower (died 1943)
 8 April – Albert I of Belgium (died 1934)
 29 June – Adrienne Barbanson, aristocrat (died 1944)
 31 July – Lucie Dejardin, politician (died 1945)
 21 August – Maurice Lippens, politician (died 1956)
 22 September – Ferdinand Perier, missionary (died 1968)
 1 October – Eugeen Van Mieghem, painter (died 1930)
 11 October – Émile Fairon, archivist (died 1945)
 12 October – Émile Merlin, astronomer (died 1938)
 26 November – Princess Marie of Croÿ (died 1968)
 8 December – Jenny Montigny, painter (died 1937)
 31 December – Jeanne de Vietinghoff, writer (died 1926)

Deaths

 15 January – Jean Baptiste Julien d'Omalius d'Halloy (born 1783), geologist
 24 January – Jean-Joseph Raikem (born 1787), politician
 2 February – Luigi Agnesi (born 1833), singer and composer
 30 March – Marie Pleyel (born 1811), pianist
 4 May – Rosalie Loveling (born 1834), author
 10 May – Michel Van Cuyck (born 1797), artist
 22 August – Charles Venneman (born 1802), painter
 11 November – Ernest Louis de Gonzague Vandenpeereboom (born 1807), industrialist and politician
 12 November – Paul Lauters (born 1806), artist

References

 
Belgium
Years of the 19th century in Belgium
1870s in Belgium
Belgium